The Mazda-Go (Japanese: マツダ号) is a three-wheeled open "truck" that was first produced in 1931 and resembled a motorcycle with an open wagon or truck bed. It entered the market on 3 October 1931. It was the first vehicle manufactured by Mazda and has been considered to be the first auto rickshaw built, although Daihatsu's HB appeared in the same year. The original model's type name was DA, with the "Mazda-Go" brand name being used to sell it and subsequent generations. After a July 1931 agreement, the Mazda-Go was sold by the Mitsubishi Zaibatsu in Japan and later on in export markets as well. Mitsubishi retained the distribution rights in Japan until August 1936, and for export sales until December 1937. Development had begun in 1929, a year after Mazda's first trial production of motorcycles.

The Mazda-Go was steered with handlebars and powered with an air-cooled one-cylinder engine/transmission combination unit. Notable refinements included a rear differential and the addition of a reverse gear. The in-house developed engine displaced 482 cc and produced , powering the rear wheels through a three-speed transmission. Over the years, it would be produced in different variants and spawned other similar designs such as the Hopestar and Daihatsu Midget. A more powerful version called the DB soon appeared, and a number of other Mazda-Go iterations like the DC and the heavier KC types. The last version to appear before World War II was the 1938 GA-type, which re-entered production in December 1945 as Mazda's first post-war product.

The Mazda-Go range was replaced in the post-war era by an entire range of three-wheeled Mazda trucks, including the K360 and the Mazda T-2000 (ja).

References

Mazda-Go
Mazda-Go
First car made by manufacturer
Three-wheeled motor vehicles